Aydınlar is a village in the Yayladere District, Bingöl Province, Turkey. The village is populated by Kurds of the Kubat tribe and had a population of 47 in 2021.

Tha hamlets of Bölükören, Çavuşlu, Dağarcık, Dursun, Hacı, Pınarcık and Yağmurdere are attached to the village.

References 

Villages in Yayladere District
Kurdish settlements in Bingöl Province